Soar, Cwmaman was a Welsh Calvinistic Methodist chapel in Fforchaman Road, Cwmaman, Rhondda Cynon Taf, Wales.

Foundation and early history
The cause was formed during the Religious Revival of 1859 which was led by Dafydd Morgan. A branch of Libanus, Aberaman, early meetings were held at the home of Thomas Anthony, an engineer at the Shepherd's Pit in the village. However, in 1868 the first building collapsed due to its being located directly above a coal level owned by one David Bevan. The chapel was rebuilt the following year.

In 1878 the first Cwmaman village Eisteddfod was held at Soar.

Later history
Rebuilt again in 1895 at a cost of £3,070, the new chapel had searing for 650 people. The memorial stone was laid by D.A. Thomas MP.  The first two ministers were the Rev W. Tefilan Griffiths and the Rev Williams Davies. W.D. Morris was minister for forty years from 1886 until 1926 and during this period the membership reached 350 in 1912.

Soar eventually closed in 1992 and the building was demolished in 1998.

References

Bibliography

External links

Chapels in Rhondda Cynon Taf
Churches completed in 1870
Methodist churches in Wales
Former Methodist churches in the United Kingdom